Judd Douglas Hamilton is an American singer, musician, former band leader, writer, film producer, actor, inventor, and company director. He recorded for the Dolton, Liberty, American International, United Artists and RCA Victor labels. He contributed to the music of California, and to surf music from his involvement with the T-Bones and 1960s surf groups, the Avantis and the Ventures. During the 1960s, he was part of the groups Judd Hamilton & the Furys, The Marketts and The T-Bones. As a film and television producer, he was the executive producer and co-screenwriter for the films Maniac and The Last Horror Film, and the executive producer for The 7th Annual Sci-Fi Awards, a 90-minute TV special. His brother was Dan Hamilton. He was married to English actress Caroline Munro for some years.

Judd and Dan were members of The Marketts.

Music career

1960s
In 1960, Hamilton was a freshman at Wenatchee Valley College. He entered a talent show with a song he wrote. He was approached by KMEL DJ Don Bernier, who was in the audience that night. Bernier proposed that Hamilton should record with a band called The Furys. A few weeks later, Bernier drove the band over to a Spokane radio station, recording a few tracks. In 1961, the single was reported in Billboard Music Week as having some sales potential. It went into the KMEL Top 10. 

Hamilton & the Furys appeared at Wenatchee's Roller Rink as the opening act for the Ventures and Bobby Vee. Guitarist Bob Bogle invited Hamilton to look him up if he was ever in Hollywood. Hamilton left college in 1961 and headed to Hollywood where he was invited to work as a roadie for the Ventures. Within the year, Bogle decided to record a single with Hamilton, "On A Night Like This" backed with "'Til I Found You", under the name of Shane. It was arranged by Hank Levine, and advertised in Billboard.

In 1963, he recorded the Johnny Mercer song "Dream", backed by the Ventures, along with an original composition, "Your Only Boy", releasing on Dolton. It was given a four star rating: it had potential to be stocked. It was given a B+ rating by Cash Box, with the reviewer mentioning a similarity with The Marcels' song "Blue Moon".

In 1965, "No Matter What Shape (Your Stomach's In)" by the T-Bones was climbing the charts. The musicians that played on the recording were session musicians, the Wrecking Crew. Liberty Records wanted to promote the song, while the Wrecking Crew were on the road. Hamilton was approached by Joe Saraceno, a producer for Liberty in November. He got the job of putting together a band to play live as the T-Bones. Hamilton became the rhythm guitarist for the group and made his brother Dan be the lead-guitarist. He got George Dee to be the bass player, Gene Pello on drums and Richard Torres as keyboard and sax player. Dan Hamilton and Richard Torres left the band and were replaced by Tommy Reynolds, Joe Frank Carollo and Jay Allen. A touring version of the T-Bones was formed. The T-Bones recorded Everyone's Gone to the Moon, the last studio album credited to the T-Bones. The photo of this line up is on the back of the album.

In 1966, according to Cash Box, T-Bones' line up was 23 year old Judd Hamilton on rhythm guitar, his 21 year old brother "Danny" on lead guitar, 24 year old drummer Gene Pello, 23 year old bass guitarist George Dee, and 23 year old organist and saxophonist Richard Torres. They completed an LP.

1970s to 1980s
By June 1970, Hamilton had completed his part in the Paramount Pictures film A Talent for Loving, while his next solo single, a Johnny Cymbal composition, "Rules" and "Someday Morning", was released on American International Records.<ref>'American International Records, June 30, 1970 - Talent, From The Music Capitals of the World, DOMESTIC, LOS ANGELES</ref> He was one of the first acts that signed to the label. That year, he had singles "Sunshine Man" and "Baltimore" release on American International Records A-163. The record was made up of swamp pop. Record World gave it four stars.

In 1971, he had a single released on the United Artists label, "Mixed-Up Guy". Record Mirror had it as a Mirror Pick. Even though the reviewer noted Hamilton's good singing, the record was noted more for performance than sales. Other singles released were "Rose by Any Other Name" and "Don't Be Afraid of the World", and on the following year "Long Road" and "C'Est La Vie".

Between 1975 and 1977, at least four singles were released with his wife Caroline Munro, including "You Got It". They were the first act to have a UK release on the new Aquarius label.'Record Mirror, April 10, 1976 - Page 25 james hamilton's DISCO PAGE Some singles were billed as made by Judd and Miss Munro. The couple divorced in 1982.

Production, composer, A&R
In 1964, along with former Dolton Records label mate Bill Shaw, Hamilton worked for Regency Records as an A&R man.Billboard, August 29, 1964 - Page 10 Talent, People and Places by Mike Gross One of the acts he recorded was Danny and the Memories. He also had Pat and Lolly Vegas, his brother Dan, Leon Russell, Dave Gates and Gary Leeds to record as the Avantis, producing "Gypsy Surfer" and "Wax 'em Down".Redbone's Official Website - The origins of Redbone from 1960 to 1969 Backed with "Gypsy Surfer", it was released on Chancellor C-1144 and became a local hit. It was also picked by the Astra label and bootlegged.Pop Surf Culture: Music, Design, Film, and Fashion from the Bohemian Surf Boom, by Brian Chidester and Domenic Priore, 2008,  - Page 105

After recording the final T-Bones album, Dan Hamilton rejoined the group for a Japan tour with the lineup once again, including the Hamilton Bros., along with Joe Frank Carollo and Tommy Reynolds. After the Japanese tour, the T-Bones disbanded. Dan, Joe Frank and Tommy got back together in 1970 as Hamilton, Joe Frank & Reynolds. Judd lived in London and helped from behind the scenes. The band signed a record deal with ABC Dunhill. Their first single, "Don't Pull Your Love Out", became a million selling gold record, reaching No. 1 on Cashbox and No. 3 on the Billboard charts in 1971. Reynolds left the group in 1972. Alan Dennison joined, on keyboards. They eventually signed with Playboy Records and made their first single, "Fallin' in Love", became their next gold record hitting No. 1 on the Billboard Charts in 1975.

In 1990, after spending twenty years in Europe, Hamilton returned to Spokane. He started his own small recording studio and was looking forward to working on a project with his brother Dan as the Hamilton Brothers. Dan Hamilton died just before Christmas in 1994. In 1995, an interview with Judd Hamilton in the Spokesman-Review, there was a strong indication that Hamilton was going to produce a greatest hits CD on a Spokane label.

Film work
Hamilton had a co-starring role in the Richard Quine 1969 Western, A Talent for Loving. He played the part of Jim, one of Major Patten's adopted sons. It was allegedly on the set that Hamilton met Caroline Munro who was to become his wife. In 1978 he co-starred in the sci-fi film Starcrash alongside Caroline Munro, Christopher Plummer, David Hasselhoff, Marjoe Gortner, Joe Spinell. Along with Joe Spinell, he was the executive producer for the 1980 horror film Maniac which starred Spinell and Caroline Munro.

In 1980, he played a major role in the television special, 1980 Sci-Fi Awards, where he was an executive producer and writer. The event was hosted by Caroline Munro and Mark Hamill. During a rehearsal, Caroline Munro was overcome by a fever and nearly fell from the stage.FilmFracture, JUNE 27, 2019 - Cinema Fearité Presents Joe Spinell And Caroline Munro In ‘The Last Horror Film’  BY JAMES JAY EDWARDS

In 1981 he co-wrote the screenplay, executively produced and co-starred in his last film The Last Horror Film, which starred Caroline Munro and Joe Spinell.TV Guide - The Last Horror Film, CAST & CREW

Discography

Filmography

Further reading
 Superstar in a Masquerade, by William Sargent · 2021,  - Judd Hamilton
 The Spokesman-Review'', Thu., Jan. 5, 1995 - Music Still Keeps Late Rock Star’s Memory Alive by Doug Clark
 New Age Universe - Judd Hamilton
 Sonic Hits - Judd Hamilton

References

External links
 45Cat: Judd Hamilton
 Pipeline Issue 77: The Avantis – The T-Bones – The Ventures – all part of the Judd & Danny Hamilton Story
 Discogs: Judd Hamilton
 IMDb: Judd Hamilton
 Northwest Music Archives | HAMILTON, JUDD

RCA Victor artists
United Artists Records artists
Dolton Records artists
20th-century American male actors
20th-century American writers
20th-century American male writers
American music arrangers
People from Ferry County, Washington
Living people
1942 births
The Marketts members
The T-Bones members